Mendi Urban LLG is a local-level government (LLG) of Southern Highlands Province, Papua New Guinea. The Mendi language is spoken in the LLG.

Wards
06. Teta
07. Wakwak/Umbimi
08. Longo/Kave
09. Mes Wa
10. Kumin/Kambiakip
11. Tubiri
12. Poromanda/Unjamap
13. Tente 1
14. Tente 2
81. Mendi Town
82. Wakwak Urban

References

Local-level governments of Southern Highlands Province